John Glover may refer to:

Artists
John Glover (actor) (born 1944), American actor
John Glover (artist) (1767–1849), English-Australian painter
John William Glover (1815–1899), Irish composer

Politicians
John Glover (MP), cloth merchant and member of the Parliament of England
John Montgomery Glover (1822–1891), U.S. Representative from Missouri and Civil War cavalry colonel 
John Milton Glover (1852–1929), U.S. Representative from Missouri
John Glover (New Zealand politician) (1866–1947), first secretary of the New Zealand Labour Party

Sports
John Glover (cricketer, born 1989), Welsh cricketer
John Glover (cricketer, born 1992), English cricketer
John Glover (footballer) (1876–1955), English footballer

Others
Charles John Glover, known as Sir John Glover, Lord Mayor of Adelaide 1960–1963, see List of mayors and lord mayors of Adelaide 
John Glover (preacher) (1714–1774), English preacher
John Glover (general) (1732–1797), American general
John Glover (late 18th century), American soldier and pioneer who first settled Greensburg, Kentucky
John Hawley Glover (1829–1885), British Naval captain
John Wayne Glover (1932–2005), Australian serial killer
Jonathan Glover (born 1941), British philosopher
John Corbett Glover (1909–1949), Catholic priest
John Glover committed "one of the first mass school shootings" on February 17, 1922
John Glover was a white Confederate veteran who was one of the wealthiest citizens in Rome, Georgia when he died of natural causes in 1922. 
John "Cockey" Glover was lynched by a mob after allegedly taking part in the shooting of Deputy Sheriff Walter C. Byrd

See also
Jon Glover (born 1952), British actor
John Roberts, Chief Judge of the Supreme Court of the United States, whose middle name is Glover